Tiui Faamaoni (born 21 April 1966) is a Samoan boxer. He competed in the men's bantamweight event at the 1988 Summer Olympics.

References

External links
 

1966 births
Living people
Bantamweight boxers
Samoan male boxers
Olympic boxers of Samoa
Boxers at the 1988 Summer Olympics
Place of birth missing (living people)